Roy Hasan (Hebrew: רועי חסן) (born 9 April 1983, in Hadera, Israel) is an Israeli contemporary Hebrew poet.  He is a principal member of the Ars poetica literary movement. In 2015 Hasan was awarded the 2015 Bernstein Prize.

Hasan grew up in a Mizrahi family in a lower-class neighborhood in a lower-class town, and worked as a cook during his mandatory military service. He continue to work as a low-paid cook after returning to civilian life. His poetry is regarded as part of a Mizrachi rebellion against the Ashkenazi and elitist Israeli left-wing political and literary establishment.

Selected works 

The dogs that barked in our childhood were muzzled, Haklavim shenavhu beyaldutenu hayu hasumei pe (Poetry), Tangier (טנג'יר), 2014)
No Other Memory (Hebrew: אין זיכרון אחר) (Prose), Home Mansion (Publishing), 2018
Gold Lions (Hebrew: זהב אריות) (Songs), Tangier Publishing, 2017

References

Hebrew-language poets
21st-century Israeli poets
1983 births
People from Hadera
Bernstein Prize recipients
Living people